Woodhouse House may refer to:

John T. Woodhouse House, Grosse Pointe Farms, MI, listed on the NRHP in Michigan
 Woodhouse House (Victoria, Texas), listed on the NRHP in Texas
 Woodhouse House (Virginia Beach, Virginia), listed on the NRHP in Virginia